C15 is an untarred road in eastern Namibia travelling 448 km through the Khomas, Hardap, and ǁKaras Regions. It starts in Dordabis and ends at the Mata Mata border post, leading into South Africa.

Roads in Namibia
Buildings and structures in Khomas Region
Buildings and structures in Hardap Region
Buildings and structures in ǁKaras Region
Namibia–South Africa border crossings